A list of films produced in South Korea in 1997:

External links
 1997 in South Korea

 1997 at www.koreanfilm.org

1997
South Korean
1997 in South Korea